As an experienced bilingual diplomat (Minister Plenipotentiary) and an accomplished academic, Maurice Kamga has over 25 years of experience in practicing and teaching international law in general, and international justice, in particular. Having focused a substantial part of his research on the international law of the sea, in particular following his selection in 1994 as the ninth recipient of the United Nations Hamilton Shirley Amerasinghe Fellowship on the Law of the Sea, Mr. Kamga has acquired extensive expertise in this very technical field of international law, with especial emphasis on the delimitation of maritime boundaries. His current function as Secretary of the International Court of Justice in The Hague, where he has been working for twelve years.

Maurice Kamga was elected to International Tribunal for the Law of the Sea by the United Nation General Assembly on the 26 August 2020.

References

External links 
 election of seven members of the Tribunal virtual swearing-in ceremony to be held on 1 October 2020
 (ITLOS)

International Court of Justice
Year of birth missing (living people)
Living people